Joseph Ignatius Constantine Clarke (31 July 1846 – 27 February 1927) was an Irish American newspaperman, poet, playwright, writer, and Irish nationalist.

Clarke was born in Kingstown, now called Dún Laoghaire, the port of County Dublin. The family moved to London, when he was twelve years old. He worked as a clerk in the Board of Trade. In 1868, for patriotic motives he resigned and went to Paris and then emigrated to the USA. Clarke became a noted journalist and playwright in  America. He was the assistant editor of the Irish Times (1868–1870) and then joined the New York Herald. While at the Herald, he authored the 1874 Central Park Zoo Escape hoax, under the direction of managing editor T.B. Connery. He was the managing editor of the New York Morning Journal from 1883–1895, editor of the Criterion from 1898–1900, and of the Sunday edition of the New York Herald from 1903-1906.

A member of the Irish Republican Brotherhood, Clarke wrote Robert Emmet: A Tragedy of Irish History (1888), which told of Emmet's life. He wrote various plays, published poetry, and in 1925, his autobiography: My Life and Memories. His comedy "Her Majesty, the Girl Queen of Nordenmark" ran for seventy-eight performances in 1900 at the Manhattan Theatre.

His friendship with the Japanese chemist Jōkichi Takamine was reflected in a deep interest in that country. After visiting Japan in 1914, he published Japan at First Hand and he co-wrote The Imperial Japanese Mission, 1917.

References

External links

1846 births
1927 deaths
19th-century Irish people
Irish emigrants to the United States (before 1923)
People from Dún Laoghaire
American male journalists
19th-century American dramatists and playwrights
20th-century American dramatists and playwrights
American male poets
American male non-fiction writers
American theater critics